Michel Goba (born 8 August 1961) is an Ivorian former professional footballer who played as a striker. His career developed from playing with Ligue 2 clubs, including Brest, Dunkerque and Abbeville.

Personal life
Goba is the uncle of Didier Drogba. He served as a mentor and father-figure to Drogba when he lived with him in France at a young age. His son, Kévin Goba, is also a professional footballer who spent most of his career in the lower divisions of France.

References

External links
Didier Drogba's interview with FIFA

1961 births
Living people
Footballers from Abidjan
Association football forwards
Ivorian footballers
Ivory Coast international footballers
1980 African Cup of Nations players
1984 African Cup of Nations players
Africa Sports d'Abidjan players
Stade Brestois 29 players
Angoulême Charente FC players
Racing Besançon players
USL Dunkerque players
SC Abbeville players
Ligue 1 players
Ligue 2 players
Ivorian expatriate footballers
Expatriate footballers in France
Ivorian expatriate sportspeople in France